Sirous Sangchouli (born 8 December 1982) is an Iranian association football goalkeeper.

Club career

Club career statistics

Honours
Payam Khorasan
 Azadegan League : Champion 2007–08

References

Living people
1982 births
Iranian footballers
Association football goalkeepers
Payam Mashhad players
Foolad Yazd players
Fajr Sepasi players
Siah Jamegan players
Sanat Mes Kerman F.C. players